The National Coordinator for Change (CONALCAM) is a Bolivian political coordination of social movements aligned with the governing Movement for Socialism-Political Instrument for the Sovereignty of the Peoples (MAS-IPSP). It was founded on 22 January 2007, during the Constituent Assembly of 2006-2007. CONALCAM mobilizes its member organizations in support of the "process of change" which includes the drafting and implementing of a new Constitution as well as a variety of social reforms.

Structure
According to the organization's statute in September 2010, CONALCAM is made up of the following parts: the President and Vice President of the Plurinational State of Bolivia, social movement organizations, the national leadership of MAS-IPSP, and the parliamentary brigade of MAS-IPSP members in the Plurinational Legislative Assembly.

CONALCAM is governed by a National Leadership, elected once every two years with the following seven offices: President; General Secretary; Secretaries of Political Affairs, Organic (i.e., Internal) Affairs, International Affairs, and of Resolutions; and a Spokesperson.

In 2010, the organization moved to increase its local and regional activities and incorporated into its statute Departmental and Regional organizations: CODECAMs and CORECAMs.

Member organizations
As of September 2010, there are twenty national social movement organizations affiliated with CONALCAM, including the Constituent Assembly. Among these organizations are:
 Unique Confederation of Rural Laborers of Bolivia (CSUTCB)
 National Confederation of Peasant Indigenous Originary Women of Bolivia - Bartolina Sisa
 Syndicalist Confederation of Intercultural Communities of Bolivia (CSCIB)
 Confederation of Indigenous Peoples of Bolivia (CIDOB)
 National Council of Ayllus and Markas of Qullasuyu (CONAMAQ)
 General Confederation of Factory Workers of Bolivia

Conalcam also includes mining cooperatives, leftwing parties, vendors' guilds, neighbourhood associations, associations of small business enterprises, youth organizations and popular civic committees.

Mobilizations
CONALCAM was the key mobilizing organization for supporters of the MAS and the draft constitution during the 2008 unrest in Bolivia. In October 2008, it organized a march from Caracollo to La Paz to pressure the National Congress to authorize a referendum on the new constitution, which the Congress did on October 21, as tens of thousands of protesters flooded central La Paz.

References

2007 establishments in Bolivia
Left-wing politics in Bolivia
Movement for Socialism (Bolivia)
Organizations established in 2007
Political party alliances in Bolivia